Save Me is the eighth album by Irish singer and actress Clodagh Rodgers released in 1977 on the Polydor label. It was her first album for four years and her last to date, excepting compilation albums.

Track listing

All tracks written by Guy Fletcher and Doug Flett except where indicated.

"Save Me"
"Morning Comes Quickly"
"Leaving"
"Incident At The Roxy"
"Candlelight"
"Discovery" (Sally Kemp)
"The Sun's On Sausalito" (John Dawson Read)
"The Singer Of The Song"
"Put It Back Together"
"I Can't Survive"
"Loving Cup"

Production
Recorded at Audio International, London
Producer - Guy Fletcher for Sweet Water Ltd.
Engineer - Nick Ryan
Backing vocals - "Rogue" & "Promises"
Cover Design - Jo Mirowski
Photography - Fraser Wood

Clodagh Rodgers albums
1977 albums